Dunmore East is a popular tourist and fishing village in County Waterford, Ireland. Situated on the west side of Waterford Harbour on Ireland's southeastern coast, it lies within the barony of Gaultier (Gáll Tír – "foreigners' land" in Irish); a reference to the influx of Viking and Norman settlers in the area.

History
Iron Age people established a promontory fort overlooking the sea at Shanoon (referred to in 1832 as meaning the 'Old Camp' but more likely Canon Power's Sean Uaimh, 'Old Cave') at a point known for centuries as Black Nobb, where the old pilot station now stands, and underneath which a cave runs. Henceforth the place was referred to as Dun Mor, the Great Fort.

In 1640, Lord Power of Curraghmore, who owned a large amount of property in the area, built a castle on the cliff overlooking the strand about two hundred metres from St. Andrew's Church. The castle was falling into ruin by the middle of the next century and now just one tower remains. The old church of Killea (Cill Aodha  —  Aodh's Church, Aodh is Irish for Hugh) is thought to have been built in the twelfth century and one wall still stands, opposite the Roman Catholic church of The Holy Cross, at the top of Killea hill.

In Smith's history of Waterford, the village was mentioned as being a fishing port about the year 1745. The fishermen's homes were situated in the Lower Village near the Strand Inn and boats were launched from the slip at Lawlor's Beach before the harbour was built. There is mention of a fleet of fifty fishing boats working from Dunmore East in 1776.

In 1812, a decision was made at Westminster to create an entirely new landing point for passengers and the Royal Mail coming to Ireland from London and southern England. The location selected for the erection of a pier was Dunmore East. In 1814, dramatic changes took place when Alexander Nimmo, the Scottish engineer (builder of Limerick's Sarsfield Bridge) commenced work on the new harbour at Dunmore. The work consisted mainly of a massive pier or quay with an elegant lighthouse at the end. Nimmo's original estimate had been £20,000 but at the time of his death in 1832 about £93,000 had been spent and the final cost was £108,000. By then (1837) the harbour had started to silt up, and the arrival of steam meant that the winding river could be negotiated easily, so the packet station was transferred to Waterford.

The great sheltered harbour then constructed meant that Dunmore East was to gradually become an important fishing port. It also then developed into a very popular tourist resort and it is now a favourite port of call for large cruise liners visiting the south-east of Ireland. The Haven Hotel, formerly the Villa Marina, was a home built by David Malcomson of Portlaw. David married Nanette King of Waterford and he brought his new bride to live in their family home at Dunmore East. 

The Fisherman's Hall in the village was also built by Nanette Malcomson in memory of her son Joseph who had been a fisherman and died at a relatively young age. She donated the land for the building and established a deed of trust to build and maintain the Hall. On her specific instructions, no alcohol could be sold or consumed in the Hall. In addition, a fire was to be kept lit to warm and dry any of the fishermen who arrived to read the newspapers which were replenished daily in the reading room which is the present-day Library.

Sport

Dunmore East is home to many sporting clubs from sailing to Gaelic Football. Gaultier GAA which focuses primarily on Gaelic Football is located just outside the village, across the road from Dunmore FC soccer club. Gaultier GAA was founded in 1927 and compete in the Waterford Senior Football Championship as well as catering for over 100 juvenile members. Dunmore FC was founded in the 1970s initially before being re-established in the early to mid-2000s. The Waterford Harbour Sailing Club was founded in 1934.

Harbour

The harbour is one of the five designated National Fishery Harbours, and has the second highest figure for fish landings after Killybegs. In the summer months it is popular with visiting yachts which have a designated pontoon. A plan was developed in 2005 by Waterford County Council to expand the harbour to accommodate more recreational marine activities. However that plan appears to have been shelved due to lack of funding.

The first official woman crew member in a Royal National Lifeboat Institution (RNLI) Lifeboat was based at Dunmore East.

Tourism
Tourism in Dunmore East is supported by boating and sailing facilities, holiday homes, traditional pubs, a golf course and several hotels. The village is home to the Waterford Harbour Sailing Club with dinghy and keelboat sailing and the Dunmore East Adventure Centre. The local golf course is located on the cliff top overlooking the bay.

Sea angling and Diving is catered for by Dunmore East Angling Charters.

Dunmore East has several seafood restaurants, and there are a number of hotels in Dunmore: The Strand Inn and The Haven Hotel, a historic former Malcomson home and the Ocean Hotel. There are also caravan sites catering for motorhomes and touring caravans.

Among the events held in Dunmore East is the annual bluegrass festival which takes place at the end of August. During this festival the village hosts a number of bluegrass groups over the weekend during which almost every bar becomes a music venue from 3 pm until late in the evening.

Tourist walking routes have been recently opened at Dunmore East. Trails in the woods, which surround the village, 
consist of a series of marked paths of varying lengths. This includes what may be Ireland's longest sea cave at Rathmoylan. This path starts from the car park at the Shanoon.

International relations

Twin towns – Sister cities
Dunmore East is twinned with the village of Clohars-Carnoët in France.

Transport
There is a good road connection to Waterford City. Bus Éireann route 354 links the village to Waterford replacing the longstanding Suirway service which ceased at Halloween, 2022.

See also
 List of towns and villages in Ireland
 List of RNLI stations

References

External links

Deep Sea Charters Dunmore East
Official Dunmore East Tourism Web Site
Dunmore East Adventure Centre
Waterford Harbour Sailing Club
Dunmore East Golf Club
Dunmore East Angling Charters 

Towns and villages in County Waterford
Ports and harbours of the Republic of Ireland
Fishing communities in Ireland
Fishing communities